Reimberg is a village in the commune of Préizerdaul, in western Luxembourg.  , the village has a population of 172.

Préizerdaul
Villages in Luxembourg